Cassandra Delaney (born 8 September 1961 in Brisbane), is an Australian actress best known for her marriage to and divorce from American singer John Denver.  Delaney started her showbiz career during 1982 with a one-off single "Boots" a reworked country version of the 1960s Nancy Sinatra song classic "These Boots Are Made For Walkin' before moving into acting. Delaney starred in a number of Australian films, one of which, Fair Game (1986), has become a cult classic.

Personal life
Delaney married Denver in 1988, after a two-year courtship.  Settling at Denver's home in Aspen, the couple had a daughter, Jesse Belle. She and Denver separated in 1991 and divorced in 1993.

Delaney briefly had her own singing career.

Filmography

FILM

TELEVISION

References

External links

1961 births
Living people
Australian film actresses
Actresses from Brisbane